U-18 may refer to one of the following German submarines:

 , was a Type U 17 submarine launched in 1912 and that served in the First World War until sunk on 23 November 1914
 During the First World War, Germany also had these submarines with similar names:
 , a Type UB II submarine launched in 1915 and sunk 9 December 1917
 , a Type UC II submarine launched in 1916 and sunk 19 February 1917
 , a Type UC I submarine; while in Austro-Hungarian service, she was renamed U-18
 , a Type IIB submarine that served in the Second World War and was scuttled on 25 August 1944
 , a Type 206 submarine of the Bundesmarine that was launched in 1973 and sold to Columbia after decommissioning in 2011 for spare parts.

Submarines of Germany